Ust-Tsilemsky District (Ćilimdïn rajon) is an administrative district (raion), one of the twelve in the Komi Republic, Russia. It is located in the northwest of the republic. Its administrative center is the rural locality (a selo) of Ust-Tsilma. As of the 2010 Census, the total population of the district was 13,036, with the population of Ust-Tsilma accounting for 37.4% of that number.

Geography
The district's administrative center is located on the Pechora River across from the mouths of both the Tsilma and Pizhma Rivers.

Administrative and municipal status
Within the framework of administrative divisions, Ust-Tsilemsky District is one of the twelve in the Komi Republic. The district is divided into ten selo administrative territories and one settlement administrative territory, which comprise thirty-seven rural localities. As a municipal division, the district is incorporated as Ust-Tsilemsky Municipal District. Its eleven administrative territories are incorporated as eleven rural settlements within the municipal district. The selo of Ust-Tsilma serves as the administrative center of both the administrative and municipal district.

References

Notes

Sources

Districts of the Komi Republic